Nuseirat is a Palestinian refugee camp located five kilometers north-east of Deir al-Balah. The refugee camp is in the Deir al-Balah Governorate, Gaza Strip. According to the Palestinian Central Bureau of Statistics, the Refugee Camp had a population of 64,423 in mid-year 2006.

The Nuseirat camp was named after the local Nuseirat tribe, part of the larger Hanajira confederation, that historically dominated the area between Deir al-Balah and Gaza. Most refugees came from the southern areas of Palestine such as Beersheba and the coastal plain. Prior to the camp's establishment by UNRWA, the roughly 16,000 original refugees settled in the grounds of a former British military prison at the site.

References

External links 
Nuseirat articles from UNWRA
 Welcome To al-Nusayrat R.C.

Palestinian refugee camps in the Gaza Strip
Deir al-Balah Governorate